Under UNESCO’s Man and the Biosphere Programme (MAB), there are 70 biosphere reserves recognized as part of the World Network of Biosphere Reserves in African States as of 2016. These are distributed across 28 countries. While biosphere reserves in West African, East African, Central African and Southern African countries are organised in the AfriMAB regional network, biosphere reserves in Northern African countries are organised in the ArabMAB, UNESCO's regional MAB network (see World Network of Biosphere Reserves in the Arab States for reserves in these countries).

The list
Below is the list of biosphere reserves in Africa, organized by country/territory, along with the year these were designated as part of the World Network of Biosphere Reserves.

Benin
 Pendjari (1986)
 'W' Region (2002, together with Burkina Faso and Niger)
 Mono River (2017, shared with Togo)

Burkina Faso
 Mare aux Hippopotames (1986)
 'W' Region (2002, together with Benin and Niger)

Cameroon
 Waza (1979)
 Benoué (1981)
 Dja (1981)

Central African Republic
 Basse-Lobaye (1977)
 Bamingui-Bangoran (1979)

Congo
 Odzala-Kokoua National Park  
 Dimonika  (1988)

Côte d'Ivoire
 Taï (1977)
 Comoé (1983)

Democratic Republic of the Congo
 Yangambi (1976)
 Luki (1976)
 Lufira (1982)

Egypt
 Omayed (1981, extension 1998)
 Wadi Allaqi (1993)

Ethiopia
 Kafa(2010)
 Yayu (2010)   
 Sheka(2012)
 Lake Tana (2015)
 Majang Forest (2017)

Gabon
 Impassa-Makokou (1983)

Ghana
 Bia National Park (1983)
 Songor (2011)
 Lake Bosomtwe (2016)

Guinea
 Mount Nimba (1980)
 Massif du Ziama (1980)
 Badiar (2002)
 Haut Niger (2002)

Guinea-Bissau
 Boloma Bijagós (1996)

Kenya
 Mount Kenya (1978)
 Mount Kulal (1978)
 Malindi-Watamu (1979)
 Kiunga (1980)
 Amboseli (1991)
 Mount Elgon (2003)

Madagascar
 Mananara Nord National Park (1990)
 Sahamalaza-Iles Radama (2001)
 Littoral de Toliara (2003)

Malawi
 Mount Mulanje (2000)
 Lake Chilwa (2006)

Mali
 Boucle du Baoulé (1982)

Mauritania
 Sénégal River Delta (2005, together with Senegal)

Mauritius
 Macchabee/Bel Ombre (1977)

Morocco
 Arganeraie (1998)
 Oasis du sud marocain (2000)
 Intercontinental Biosphere Reserve of the Mediterranean (together with Spain) (2006)
 Atlas Cedar (2016)

Niger
 Aïr et Ténéré (1977)
 'W' Region (2002, together with Benin and Burkina Faso)
 Gababedji (2017)

Nigeria
 Omo (1977)

Rwanda
 Volcans (1983)

São Tomé and Príncipe
 Island of Príncipe (2012)

Senegal
 Samba Dia (1979)
 Delta du Saloum (1980)
 Niokolo-Koba (1981)
 Sénégal River Delta (2005, together with Mauritania)
 Ferlo (2012)

South Africa
 Kogelberg Nature Reserve (1998)
 Cape West Coast (2000)
 Waterberg (2001)
 Kruger to Canyons Biosphere (2001)
 Cape Winelands Biosphere Reserve (2007)
 Vhembe Biosphere Reserve (2009) (ref Vhembe)
 Gouritz Cluster Biosphere Reserve (2015)
 Magaliesberg Biosphere Reserve (2015)
 Garden Route (2017)

Sudan
 Dinder (1979)
 Radom (1979)
 Jebel Dair (2017)

Togo
 Oti-Keran / Oti-Mandouri (2011)
 Mono River (2017, shared with Benin)

Uganda
 Queen Elizabeth (Rwenzori) (1979)
 Mount Elgon (2005)

United Republic of Tanzania
 Lake Manyara (1981)
 Serengeti-Ngorongoro (1981)
 East Usambara (2000)
 Jozani-Chwaka Bay (2016)

Zimbabwe
 Middle Zambezi (2010)

References

External links
 UNESCO list of biosphere reserves in Africa
 Database of the UNESCO World Network of Biosphere Reserves
 AfriMAB website
 ArabMAB website

+
Biosphere reserves